The 2014 season for the  cycling team began in January at the 2014 La Tropicale Amissa Bongo. The team participated in UCI Continental Circuits and UCI World Tour events when given a wildcard invitation.

2014 roster

Riders who joined the team for the 2014 season

Season victories

Footnotes

References

2014 road cycling season by team
Team Qhubeka NextHash